Buckle Island is one of the three main islands in the uninhabited Balleny Islands group located in the Southern Ocean. The island forms some parts of the Ross Dependency, claimed by New Zealand.

Description
The island is roughly triangular in shape, with long east and west coasts and a short north coast. It is of volcanic origin, and is still volcanically active, the last eruption being in 1899.

The northernmost point is Cape Cornish. Several small islets also lie in the channel separating Cape Cornish and Young Island, the largest of which is Borradaile Island. Both Buckle Island and Sabrina Islet are home to colonies of Adelie and chinstrap penguins.

See also 
 List of Antarctic and subantarctic islands

References

External links

Stratovolcanoes of New Zealand
Volcanoes of the Southern Ocean
Islands of the Balleny Islands
Volcanoes of the Balleny Islands
Volcanic islands